Chaudhry Raza Nasrullah Ghumman is a Pakistani politician who had been a member of the National Assembly of Pakistan from August 2018 till January 2023. Previously he was a Member of the Provincial Assembly of the Punjab, from 2008 to May 2018.

Early life and education
He was born on 10 March 1955 in Lahore.

He has done graduation.

Political career
He  ran for the seat of the National Assembly of Pakistan as a candidate of Pakistan Peoples Party (PPP) from Constituency NA-80 (Faisalabad-VI) in 2002 Pakistani general election but was unsuccessful. He received 40,264 votes and lost the seat 

He was elected to the Provincial Assembly of the Punjab as a candidate of Pakistan Muslim League (N) (PML-N) from Constituency PP-62 (Faisalabad-XII) in 2008 Pakistani general election. He received 31,742 votes and defeated Rai Ahsan Raza Khara, a candidate of Pakistan Muslim League (Q) (PML-Q). In the same election, he also ran for the seat of the National Assembly as an independent candidate from Constituency NA-77 (Faisalabad-III) but was unsuccessful. He received 55 votes and lost the seat to Muhammad Asim Nazir.

He was re-elected to the Provincial Assembly of the Punjab as a candidate of PML-N from Constituency PP-62 (Faisalabad-XII) in 2013 Pakistani general election. He received 53,406 votes and defeated Ali Akhtar, a candidate of PML-Q. In the same election, he also ran for the seat of the National Assembly as an independent candidate from Constituency NA-80 (Faisalabad-VI) but was unsuccessful. He received 5,905 votes and lost the seat to Mian Muhammad Farooq.

In March 2018, he quit PML-N and joined Pakistan Tehreek-e-Insaf (PTI).

He was re-elected to the National Assembly as a candidate of PTI from Constituency NA-105 (Faisalabad-V) in 2018 Pakistani general election.

References

External Link

More Reading
 List of members of the 15th National Assembly of Pakistan

Living people
1958 births
Punjab MPAs 2008–2013
Punjab MPAs 2013–2018
Pakistani MNAs 2018–2023
Pakistan Muslim League (N) MPAs (Punjab)
Pakistan Tehreek-e-Insaf MNAs
Politicians from Lahore